Wiremu "Wī" Te Tau Huata  (23 September 1917 – 20 December 1991) was a New Zealand  Anglican priest and military chaplain. Of Māori descent, he identified with the Ngāti Kahungunu iwi. He was born at Mohaka in northern Hawke's Bay, New Zealand, on 23 September 1917.

Huata was chaplain to the 28th New Zealand (Maori) Battalion, which was part of the Second New Zealand Expeditionary Force (2NZEF) during World War II. He was awarded the Military Cross for his service in Italy. After the war he married Ringahora Hēni Ngākai Ybel Tomoana, the daughter of Paraire Tomoana and Kuini Raerena. 

In the 1984 Queen's Birthday Honours, Huata was appointed a Companion of the Queen's Service Order for community service. In the 1991 New Year Honours, he was made a Commander of the Order of the British Empire, for services to the community.

Huata was the third generation of his family who was an Anglican minister in the Diocese of Waiapu. His father was the Rev. Hēmi Pītiti Huata, who was ordained as a priest in 1898 and appointed as the vicar at Frasertown, near Wairoa. His grandfather, Tāmihana Huata,  joined the Church Missionary Society (CMS) and on 25 September 1864 he was ordained as a priest and was appointed as the vicar at Frasertown.

References

1917 births
1991 deaths
20th-century New Zealand Anglican priests
Ngāti Kahungunu people
New Zealand Māori religious leaders
New Zealand military personnel
People from Wairoa District
New Zealand Commanders of the Order of the British Empire
Companions of the Queen's Service Order
New Zealand recipients of the Military Cross